The Democratic Renewal Party (in Albanian: Partia Demokratike e Rinovuar) is a political party in Albania led by Dashamir Shehi. It was formed following a split from the New Democratic Party.

In the 2005 parliamentary elections, the party was part of the Movement for National Development coalition.

References 

Political parties in Albania